The Colorado School for the Deaf and Blind (CSDB) is a K-12 residential school, located on Knob Hill,  east of downtown Colorado Springs, Colorado, near the famous laboratory of Nikola Tesla. The school was founded in 1874 as The Colorado Institute for the Education of Mutes by Jonathan R. Kennedy, who had previously been steward at the Kansas State School For the Deaf. The school began in a rented house in downtown Colorado Springs with seven students, three of whom were Kennedy's own children. One of his children, Emma, later married another student, Frank H. Chaney, and they became the parents of the actor Lon Chaney.

Colorado Springs' founder William Jackson Palmer was the land-grantor of several institutions in Colorado Springs, including the Colorado School for the Deaf and Blind.

CSDB were the 2004 National Champions in the Deaf Academic Bowl.

CSDB serves students and their families who are deaf, blind, or both.  CSDB also coordinates the Colorado Home Intervention Program (CHIP) that serves deaf and hard of hearing students from birth to three years old within their home.  CSDB provides outreach services to support students, families, and school districts throughout Colorado.

Campus
The facility has dormitories for students.

References

External links

High schools in Colorado Springs, Colorado
Educational institutions established in 1874
Schools for the deaf in the United States
Schools for the blind in the United States
Public elementary schools in Colorado
Public middle schools in Colorado
Public high schools in Colorado
Public K-12 schools in the United States
Schools in Colorado Springs, Colorado
1874 establishments in Colorado Territory
Public boarding schools in the United States
Boarding schools in Colorado